René-Alfred-Octave Guillou (8 October 1903 in Rennes – 14 December 1958 in Paris) was a French composer.

After several years at the conservatory of his native city, Guillou studied at the Conservatoire de Paris with Marcel Samuel-Rousseau, Charles-Marie Widor and Henri Busser. In his third participation in the competition for the Prix de Rome, he won the Premier Grand Prix in 1926 with the cantata L'Autre mère.

Besides, since 1920, Guillou was the successor of Jacques de La Presle, organist at the great organ of the Church of Notre-Dame, Versailles, restored by Merklin. In 1923 he played the organ part here in a performance of the oratorio Marie-Madeleine by Jules Massenet. In 1926 he handed over the post to Madeleine Heurtel, a niece of Léon Boëllmann and daughter of the director of the École Niedermeyer, in order to begin his stay in the Villa Medici in Rome, associated with the Prix de Rome.

During his stay in Rome until 1930, Guillou composed his Habenera for violin and orchestra; in addition, he composed two symphonies and other orchestral works, chamber music and songs. His brother Ernest Guillou became known as a conductor and composer.

Guillou died in Paris in 1956.

Works 
Les Amants de Vérone, cantata, 1924
L’Autre mère, cantata, 1926
Élégie for viola (or English horn) and piano, 1927
Habanera for violin and orchestra, 1927 with the Concerts Lamoureux
Pièces for piano, 1927
Assise for piano, 1928
Puisque j'ai mis ma lèvre after a poem by Victor Hugo, 1928 at the Académie de France à Rome
Mezzogiorno - Midi sur Rome 1929 at the Lyceum Romano
Andante symphonique for pipe organ, 1929
Cortège de nonnes for organ, 1929
Loetitia Pia for organ, 1929
Nocturne mystique for organ, 1929
Diurnes for piano, 1929
Plein air for piano, 1929
Quatre pièces for piano, 1929
Suite des motifs de terroir for piano, 1929
Trois pièces for violin and piano, 1931
Adagio et Suite for piano and cello, 1934
Ballade for bassoon and piano, 1936
Hymne de la Bretagne à Paris, for the Exposition Internationale des Arts et Techniques dans la Vie Moderne in Paris, 1937
Hymne funèbre, with the Concerts Colonne 1938
Sonatine for alto saxophone, English horn or French horn and piano, 1946
Symphonie en la mineur, 1948
Mon nom est Rolande, Legend for French horn and piano, 1950
Seconde Symphonie en ut majeur, 1956 Pierre-Michel Le Conte conducting

References

External links 

1903 births
1958 deaths
Musicians from Rennes
Conservatoire de Paris alumni
French classical organists
French male organists
French classical composers
French male classical composers
20th-century French composers
Prix de Rome for composition
20th-century organists
20th-century French male musicians
Male classical organists